Fritz Christiansen (27 January 1889 – 8 August 1955) was a Danish wrestler. He competed in the Greco-Roman lightweight event at the 1920 Summer Olympics.

References

External links
 

1889 births
1955 deaths
Olympic wrestlers of Denmark
Wrestlers at the 1920 Summer Olympics
Danish male sport wrestlers
Place of birth missing
20th-century Danish people